G. C. D. Bharti (Bharati Bandhu) is an Indian musician known for his Kabir bhajans.

Early life
He was born on 15 April in Raipur, in the Indian state of Chhattisgarh to Vidhyadhar Gaina Bharti. His early musical training was under his father's tutelage and later, trained Ghazal, Thumri and Dadra under Ustad Ashiq Ali Khan and Sufi music under Ustad Haji Eid Ali Shah Chishti.

History 
Bharti is the lead vocalist of Bharti Bandhu Group, an Indian musical troupe based in Raipur, Chhattisgarh. The members of Bharti Bandhu are GCD Bharti, Vivekanand Bharti, G Ramanand Bharti and C Vidrumna Vachaspati Bharti. Their musical style has been developed from family musical tradition. The troupe has been reported to have performed in four Chhattisgarhi movies, Pirit Ke Jang, Chhattisgarh Mahatari, Ram Milahi Jodi and Muktiram. Bharti Bandu sing Sufi songs and the verses of Kabir. The troupe has performed widely in India, and have given nearly 6000 performances. The members of the group have trained thousand of students.

Awards
Bharti was honored by the Government of India, in 2013, with the fourth highest Indian civilian award of Padma Shri.

References

External links

Official Website

<
Bharti Bandhu | Underscore Records

Indian male classical musicians
People from Raipur, Chhattisgarh
Recipients of the Padma Shri in arts
Sufi artists
1959 births
Living people